James Boland (1856–1894) was an Irish republican.

James Boland may also refer to:

Other people
James C. Boland, American businessman
Jim Boland (rugby league), see List of Parramatta Eels players

Fictional characters
Jimmy Boland (Falling Skies)
Jimmy Boland, character in Bloodfist III: Forced to Fight

See also